The incarnations of Aries are fictional supervillains appearing in American comic books published by Marvel Comics. The characters were usually depicted as members of incarnations of the supervillain group, the Zodiac.

In the history of the Marvel Universe, seven different characters have assumed the role of Aries. All of them have been members of the villainous Zodiac and used horns on their head to ram their opponents. The third Aries was a Life Model Decoy created by Jake Fury. The second and fourth Aries' were African-American.

Publication history
The original human Aries, Marcus Lassiter, first appeared in The Avengers #72 (Jan. 1970), and was created by writer Roy Thomas and artist Sal Buscema. The character subsequently appears in The Avengers #82 (Nov. 1970), in which he is killed.

The second human Aries, Grover Raymond, first appeared in The Avengers #120-123 (Feb.–May 1974), and was created by Steve Englehart and Bob Brown. The character subsequently appears in Ghost Rider #7 (August 1974), and Captain America #177-178 (September–October 1974), in which he is killed.

Aries appeared as part of the "Zodiac" entry in the Official Handbook of the Marvel Universe Deluxe Edition #20.

Fictional character biography

Marcus Lassiter

Nothing is known about how Lassiter joined the Cartel or any of his dealings with their group prior to their first battle with the Avengers.

In order to take down the Zodiac Cartel Nick Fury, disguised as Scorpio captured the Avengers. He called the Cartel for a meeting in order to present the Avengers to them. The Avengers managed to break free before the Cartel could execute them. Fury unmasked himself and joined the heroes in fighting off the Zodiac Cartel. Aries managed to claim the Zodiac Key, and led the Cartel to their escape through a hole in the wall.

Lassiter led the reorganization of the Cartel and its planning to take over Manhattan. A mercenary group in the Zodiac's employ was sent to Avengers Mansion and was able to subdue the Avengers who were subsequently put into stasis. The Aries-led Zodiac army was able to take over Manhattan. Aries used the Zodiac Key to entrapping it within a force field. The Cartel demanded one billion dollars or they threatened to kill the entire population of Manhattan. The Black Panther and Daredevil managed to free the Avengers, and, in the ensuing battle, Aries was apparently slain. Thor destroyed his vessel with a bolt of lightning. The rest of the Zodiac Cartel escaped capture.

Grover Raymond

Grover Raymond was recruited by Taurus to replace Marcus Lassiter as Aries. The Zodiac Cartel decided to kill every person born under the sign of Gemini because they thought them to be untrustworthy. The Cartel was defeated by the Avengers who were able to destroy the Star-Blaster which the Zodiac was to use to fulfill their plans.

Following their defeat, Raymond was able to get the rest of the Cartel, except for Libra to back him in overthrowing Taurus as their leader. The renegade Zodiac met with Cornelius Van Lunt, the Cartel's financial backer, in an empty warehouse but were attacked by the Avengers during the meeting. Van Lunt fled, but revealed that he was Taurus and that the warehouse was, in fact, a rocketship which Taurus shot into space. The Vision was able to persuade the Zodiac to help the Avengers get back to earth rather than continue their battle. Upon their return to earth, the Avengers turned Aries and the other Zodiac, except for Libra, over to the authorities. Except for Taurus, all the Cartel ended up in prison.

While in prison, Raymond was visited by Lucifer, who had possessed the body of Rafe Michel, a criminal. In order to keep his power from consuming a single body, Lucifer offered to divide his power. Raymond agreed, and gained some of Lucifer's strength, along with his costume. They did battle with the Falcon, but managed to escape to Mr. Morgan. Morgan asked the two to kill the Falcon.

The two Lucifers attacked, but were defeated by the Falcon. Raymond-Lucifer led the other to Lucifer's base, where they revived Lucifer's undamaged Ultra-Robots and sent them to attack the Falcon. The Falcon, though, was helped by an uncostumed Captain America, who defeated the Lucifers and destroyed the Ultra-Robots. Still unable to contain Lucifer's energies, both host bodies died with Lucifer being sent back to the Nameless Dimension.

LMD

This version of Aries was a Life Model Decoy created along with an entirely new Zodiac in the Theatre of Genetics by Scorpio (aka Jake Fury). The Defenders attacked the Theatre and Scorpio was forced to activated the LMD Zodiac prematurely. The Aries LMD rushed into battle but was hampered by his clumsiness and recklessness. During the battle Moon Knight and Nighthawk were able to cause Aries to slam into a wall knocking it unconscious. The Aries LMD was taken into S.H.I.E.L.D. custody following the battle.

Later, Aries and the rest of the LMD Zodiac, led by Quicksilver, battled the Avengers whom Quicksilver was attempting to frame for treason. During an underwater battle near Avengers Mansion with a team of the heroes, the Aries and Taurus LMDs were flung out into the river and apprehended by the authorities.

After being released from prison, Aries and the rest of the LMD Zodiac attacked and killed all the human Zodiac Cartel except for Cornelius Van Lunt (aka Taurus). Soon after the LMD Zodiac attempted to rob the Denver Mint, but were interrupted by the West Coast Avengers. During the battle the Scorpio LMD brought both the Zodiac and the Avengers to the Ankh Dimension, but this had the unwanted result of shutting down all the LMDs, leaving them immobile in that foreign dimension.

Oscar Gordon

Not much is known about this version of Aries or how he joined the Zodiac Cartel. He likely was invited by Cornelius Van Lunt as done previously. Taurus later the second version of Aquarius and this incarnation of Aries tried to kill Iron Man (James Rhodes), but both failed. In their battle, Aries was defeated and turned over to the authorities. He was killed by the LMD versions of the Zodiac.

Ecliptic Aries

This incarnation of Aries was a product of genetic engineering recruited by Scorpio who was working for the Ecliptic. This version of Zodiac was sent by Scorpio to steal the Nth Projector from Department H. During their mission they were attacked and defeated by Alpha Flight, but were able to escape.

Soon after, the Director of Weapon X sent a Weapon X team to the Zodiac's castle headquarters to retrieve Madison Jeffries who had become one of the Zodiac's Gemini twins. The Zodiac were defeated and Jeffries was recovered. The Zodiac were drained of their life energy by Sauron and, after the creature had left, Weapon X blew up the castle leaving the Zodiac for dead.

Thanos' Aries

The sixth Aries is a criminal recruited and empowered by Thanos to recover various alien artifacts scattered around Earth. He battles the Avengers with the rest of the new Zodiac organization, but is eventually de-powered when Thanos no longer needs him leaving him and the other Zodiac members for dead on the self-destructing Helicarrier.

Marauders' Aries
A mutant version of Aries appears as a member of Mister Sinister's Marauders. He was traveling through the sewers with his fellow Marauders in an attempt to capture Nightcrawler. He found Nightcrawler and charged at him with his horns only for Nightcrawler to teleport the both of them where Aries ran straight into his teammates Azimuth, Chimera, and Coda. A fight broke out until Nightcrawler was knocked out by Azimuth.

Powers and abilities
The first and second Aries wore a pair of ram's horns upon their heads which they could use to ram opponents in battle. The second often carried a Star-Blazer, a pistol which could fire energy blasts. While possessed by Lucifer, his body was charged with ionic energy, granting him superhuman strength.

The third Aries possessed a pair of horns on its head, enhanced strength, and would attempt to ram its opponents in battle. In its most recent form, it also wore a suit of protective armor, and could project fire from its horns. As a LMD, it could also exist underwater.

The fourth Aries wore horns on his head which he could use to ram opponents.

The fifth Aries, as with all Aries, had horns on his head which he could use to ram opponents.

The sixth Aries possessed superhuman strength, had horns, wielded a gun, and used the Zodiac's teleportation.

The seventh Aries wore a special suit provided by Thanos which gave him super-strength and enabled him to assume the form of a humanoid ram.

In other media
 Aries appears in The Avengers: United They Stand, voiced by Tony Daniels. This version is a member of Zodiac and an alien with incredible strength.
 Aries appears in the Marvel Anime: Iron Man episode "Reap the Whirlwind" as a tornado-generating robot utilized by Zodiac and made from research on a weather manipulation project provided by the disgruntled Professor Michelini. It hunts and kills other scientists linked to the project, then attacks a military base and defeats Iron Man when he arrives to stop it. During Aries' attack on the Yokosuka Base, it kills Michelini, but Iron Man uses an EMP cannon to defeat it.
 Aries-inspired foot soldiers appear in Ultimate Spider-Man as members of Zodiac.

References

External links
 Aries I at Marvel Wiki
 Aries II at Marvel Wiki
 Aries III at Marvel Wiki
 Aries IV at Marvel Wiki
 Aries VI at Marvel Wiki
 Aries VII at Marvel Wiki
 Aries (Marauders version) at Marvel Wiki
 
 
 

Characters created by Al Milgrom
Characters created by Brian Michael Bendis
Characters created by Keith Giffen
Characters created by Mark Bagley
Characters created by Roy Thomas
Characters created by Sal Buscema
Characters created by Steve Englehart
Comics characters introduced in 1970
Comics characters introduced in 1974
Comics characters introduced in 1977
Comics characters introduced in 1984
Comics characters introduced in 1987
Comics characters introduced in 1998
Comics characters introduced in 2012
Fictional African-American people
Fictional henchmen
Marvel Comics supervillains